The 77th Motorized Infantry Brigade is one of the five maneuver elements of the 26th Group Army in the Jinan Military Region.

Brigades of the People's Liberation Army